The Mayor of Casterbridge is a British TV movie, produced by Georgina Lowe for Sally Head Productions and directed by David Thacker, based on the 1886 novel by Thomas Hardy. Appearing in the film are Ciarán Hinds as Henchard, Juliet Aubrey as Susan Henchard, Jodhi May as Elizabeth Jane, James Purefoy as Farfrae, and Polly Walker as Lucetta. The series was released as a two-disc DVD in 2004.

Plot

As in the original story, Michael Henchard, in a drunken moment, auctions his wife, Susan, and infant child to a passing seaman. Years later, Susan meets up with an apparently contrite Henchard, but he subsequently reverts to his original stubborn and unyielding character. In this version of the story, Henchard appears to be aware of his defects of character but, in the end, is unable to get past them because the traditional social tool of forgiveness constantly eludes him.
 
Occasionally, as in the characters of Elizabeth Jane and Farfrae, forgiveness is found repeatedly and life recovers. However, in so many other cases throughout this film, enmity prevails and disaster follows. Henchard, the Mayor of Casterbridge, is presented as a selfish, atheistic, personality, and his atheistic tendencies are not shown in any positive light. Even though his character is deeply flawed, Henchard does evoke considerable sympathy because his salvation requires only a change of heart. The pain of his reflexive choices is clearly evident in Ciarán Hinds' presentation of Henchard. Hardy's novel was presented in this DVD with enormous attention to historical detail. The traditional Christian concerns with love and forgiveness and the consequences of selfish behaviour, are presented with the same emphasis as in the text.

Partial cast
 Ciarán Hinds – Michael Henchard 
 Juliet Aubrey – Susan Henchard 
 Jodhi May – Elizabeth Jane 
 James Purefoy – Farfrae 
 Polly Walker – Lucetta Templeman

Notable reviews
Reviewed By: Angus Wolfe Murray at Eye for Film 
Reviewed By: TV Guide
Reviewed by: Jim Steel

References

External links
BFI Film & TV Database: The MAYOR OF CASTERBRIDGE (ITV1, 2003) The Mayor of Casterbridge (2003 film)

2003 British television series debuts
2003 British television series endings
2000s British drama television series
ITV television dramas
2000s British television miniseries
Films based on The Mayor of Casterbridge
Television series by ITV Studios
London Weekend Television shows
English-language television shows
Television shows set in England
Television shows based on works by Thomas Hardy
Films directed by David Thacker